Sovereign was launched at Newcastle in 1789. She traded between London and South Carolina and then as a transport. In 1802 she became a Guineaman, i.e., a slave ship. She wrecked on 22 January 1804 as she was returning from the West Indies where she had landed her slaves at Trinidad.

Career
Sovereign first appeared in Lloyd's Register (LR) in 1789.

The brig was had been abandoned and a strong wind was causing the seas to break over her. Sovereign arrived in the Downs on 26 November.

Lloyd's List reported on 14 November 1794 that Sovereign, Benn, master, was one of seven transports that had sailed to Toulon from Corsica as cartels. The French had detained them there. The transports were presumably carrying prisoners from the British capture of Corsica.

Slave voyage (1802–Loss): Captain John Ward sailed from London on 7 November 1802. Sovereign gathered slaves at Bonny. Ward was issued a letter of marque on 2 July 1803, but by that time he was dead. Lloyd's List (LL) reported on 3 September 1803 that Sovereign, late Ward, had arrived at Suriname from Africa and was bound for Trinidad. Ward had died while Sovereign was in Africa. She arrived at Trinidad on 22 July 1803 with 319 slaves.

Fate
On 22 January 1804 Sovereign, B.Richardson, master, struck the Smith's Rock, in the Irish Sea off Ballycotton, County Cork about a mile from shore as she was coming from Trinidad and Tortola to London. She foundered within 10 minutes of striking the rock with most on board drowning. Casualty counts differed by report. One stated that eight of 37 people on board were saved. Another stated that 31 of the 40 people on board were lost. A third stated nine out of 35 were saved. Four of the people on board were passengers, three or four of whom were saved. She was carrying sugar, coffee, indigo, hides, and elephants' teeth (ivory).

Citations

1789 ships
Ships built on the River Tyne
Age of Sail merchant ships of England
London slave ships
Maritime incidents in 1804